Dan Barrett (born December 14, 1955 in Pasadena, California) is an American arranger, cornetist, and trombonist.

The earliest mention of Dan Barrett was in the Melody Maker, 10 February 1973, which reported that he played "Ory's Creole Trombone" at the end of Kid Ory's Funeral on 28 January that year. He also played with Teddy Buckner, Andy Blakeney, and Alton Redd, all members of Ory's band, during the funeral proceedings.

Barrett played valve trombone on the soundtrack to the film, The Cotton Club, in 1984.

In addition to leading a quintet with Howard Alden, Barrett has performed as a sideman with Benny Goodman and Buck Clayton. Barrett is the musical director for Arbors Records in Clearwater, Florida.

Discography

As leader
 Strictly Instrumental (Concord Jazz, 1987)
 Let's Be Buddies with George Masso (Arbors, 1994)
 Reunion with Al (Arbors, 1995)
 Two Sleepy People with John Sheridan (Arbors, 1996)
 In Australia with Tom Baker (Arbors, 1997)
 Moon Song with Rebecca Kilgore (Arbors, 1998)
 Being a Bear: Jazz for the Whole Family with Rebecca Kilgore (Arbors, 2000)
 Dan Barrett's International Swing Party (Nagel-Heyer, 2000)
 Blue Swing (Arbors, 2000)
 Melody in Swing (Arbors, 2000)

With Howard Alden
 Swing Street (Concord Jazz, 1988)
 The ABQ Salutes Buck Clayton (Concord Jazz, 1989)
 Swing That Music (Telarc, 1993)
 Live in '95 (Arbors, 2004)

With BED
 Get Ready for BED! (Blue Swing, 2006)
 Watch Out! (Blue Swing, 2006)

As sideman
With Leon Redbone
 Red to Blue (August 1985)
 Sugar (Private Music, 1990)
 Any Time (Blue Thumb 2001)

With Randy Sandke
 Stampede (Jazzology, 1992)
 The Bix Beiderbecke Era (Nagel-Heyer, 1993)
 New York Allstars Play Jazz Favorites (Nagel-Heyer, 1993)
 Count Basie Remembered Volume One (Nagel-Heyer, 1997)
 Count Basie Remembered Volume Two (Nagel-Heyer, 1997)
 The Re-discovered Louis and Bix (Nagel-Heyer, 2000)
 Randy Sandke Meets Bix Beiderbecke (Nagel-Heyer, 2002)

With others
 John Barry, The Cotton Club (Geffen, 1984)
 Graeme Bell, Graeme Bell in Holland with the Graeme Bell All Stars (Sea Horse, 1982)
 Joe Bushkin, Play It Again, Joe (United Artists, 1977)
 Buck Clayton, A Swingin' Dream (Stash, 1989)
 Rosemary Clooney, Rosemary Clooney Sings the Lyrics of Johnny Mercer (Concord Jazz, 1987)
 Jim Cullum Jr., New Year's All Star Jam (Pacific Vista, 1993)
 Kenny Davern, East Side, West Side (Arbors, 1994)
 Peter Ecklund, Peter Ecklund and the Melody Makers (Stomp Off, 1988)
 Marty Grosz, Sings of Love and Other Matters (Statiras, 1987)
 Marty Grosz, Unsaturated Fats (Stomp Off, 1990)
 Keith Ingham, Marty Grosz Just Imagine (Stomp Off, 1994)
 Rebecca Kilgore, Jump Presents the Music of Jimmy Van Heusen (Jump, 2005)
 Butch Miles, More Miles... More Standards (Famous Door, 1985)
 Ed Polcer, Let's Hit It (BlewZ Manor 2003)
 Trevor Richards, Legends of the Swing Era (Edition 5)
 Scott Robinson, Thinking Big (Arbors, 1997)
 John Sheridan, Something Tells Me (Arbors, 1997)
 Bobby Short, How's Your Romance? (Telarc, 1999)
 Warren Vaché Jr., Easy Going (Concord Jazz, 1987)
 Terry Waldo, Footlight Varieties (Stomp Off, 1990)
 Bob Wilber, Bufadora Blow-up (Arbors, 1997)
 Bob Wilber, Everywhere You Go There's Jazz (Arbors, 1999)

References

External links
 
 Official Website

Living people
1955 births
Musicians from Pasadena, California
American jazz trombonists
Male trombonists
American jazz cornetists
American music arrangers
Jazz musicians from California
21st-century trombonists
21st-century American male musicians
American male jazz musicians
Widespread Depression Jazz Orchestra members
Arbors Records artists
Nagel-Heyer Records artists
Concord Records artists